Salvia filicifolia is a perennial plant that is native to Guangdong and Hunan provinces in China,  growing in  rocky and sandy areas. S. filicifolia grows on erect or slightly ascending stems, with inflorescences that are 6-10 flowered verticillasters in pedunculate racemes or panicles, with a  yellow corolla.

Notes

filicifolia
Flora of China
Taxa named by Elmer Drew Merrill